The Antarctic Cold Reversal (ACR) was an important episode of cooling in the climate history of the Earth during the deglaciation at the close of the last ice age. It illustrates the complexity of the climate changes at the transition from the Pleistocene to the Holocene Epochs.

The Last Glacial Maximum and sea-level minimum occurred c. 21,000 years before present (BP). Antarctic ice cores show gradual warming beginning 3,000 years later. At about 14,700 BP, there was a large pulse of meltwater, identified as Meltwater pulse 1A, probably from either the Antarctic ice sheet or the Laurentide Ice Sheet. Meltwater pulse 1A produced a marine transgression that raised global sea level about 20 meters in two to five centuries and is thought to have influenced the start of the Bølling/Allerød interstadial, the major break with glacial cold in the Northern Hemisphere. Meltwater pulse 1A was followed in Antarctica and the Southern Hemisphere by a renewed cooling, the Antarctic Cold Reversal, in c. 14,500 BP, which lasted for two millennia—an instance of warming causing cooling. The ACR brought an average cooling of perhaps 3 °C. The Younger Dryas cooling, in the Northern Hemisphere, began while the Antarctic Cold Reversal was still ongoing, and the ACR ended in the midst of the Younger Dryas.

This pattern of climate decoupling between the Northern and Southern Hemispheres and of "southern lead, northern lag" would manifest in subsequent climate events. The cause or causes of this hemispheric decoupling, of the "lead/lag" pattern and of the specific mechanisms of the warming and cooling trends are still subjects of study and dispute among climate researchers. The specific dating and intensity of the Antarctic Cold Reversal are also under debate.

The onset of the Antarctic Cold Reversal was followed, after about 800 years, by an Oceanic Cold Reversal in the Southern Ocean.

See also
Huelmo–Mascardi Cold Reversal

Notes and references

Sources

Climate of Antarctica
History of climate variability and change
Pleistocene events